Iraota is a southeast Asian and Indian genus. genus of butterflies in the family Lycaenidae. The genus was erected by Frederic Moore in 1881.

Species
Iraota abnormis (Moulton, 1911)
Iraota aurigena Fruhstorfer, 1907
Iraota distanti (Staudinger, 1889)
Iraota rochana (Horsfield, [1829]) - scarce silverstreak 
Iraota timoleon (Stoll, [1790]) - silverstreak blue

References

Amblypodiini
Lycaenidae genera
Taxa named by Frederic Moore